James Hernandez (born 15 October 2001) is an English ice dancer who represents Great Britain. With his current skating partner, Phebe Bekker, he is a two-time ISU Junior Grand Prix silver medalist, a two-time British junior national champion (2021–2022), and finished in the top 10 at the 2022 World Junior Championships. Bekker/Hernandez are the first British ice dance team to win a medal on the ISU Junior Grand Prix circuit.

With his previous partner Emily Rose Brown, Hernandez was the 2020 British junior national champion.

Personal life 
Hernandez was born on 15 October 2001 in London, England. He began learning to skate at age 4, and credited his sister with his initial interest in the sport.

As of 2022, he is currently in a relationship with the 2014 Olympic team event bronze medalist and two-time U.S national champion Gracie Gold.

Career

Early years with Brown 
Hernandez formed an ice dance partnership with Emily Rose Brown in advance of the 2015–16 season, and together they won gold at the 2016 British Novice Championships after training together for six months at Slough Ice Rink with coach Phillip Poole. This earned them their first international assignment, to the Bavarian Open's advanced novice competition, where they placed fourth.

In their first two international junior seasons, Brown/Hernandez won consecutive silver medals at the British junior championships, and three appearances on the ISU Junior Grand Prix, in addition to a number of small international competitions.

2019–20 season: Junior national gold 
In advance of the season, Brown and Hernandez began training in Philadelphia with retired British dance champions Nicholas Buckland and Penny Coomes. After placing tenth and eleventh at their two Junior Grand Prix assignments, they won gold at the British junior championships for the first time. They called this "an incredible feeling for both of us." After participating in a number of other minor junior internationals, they were assigned to compete at the 2020 World Junior Championships. Qualifying to the free dance, they finished in thirteenth position.

Following the onset of the COVID-19 pandemic, Brown opted to retire from competitive skating.

2021–22 season: Debut of Bekker/Hernandez 
In January of 2021, Hernandez announced a new partnership with Phebe Bekker. The two trained with his previous coaches Coomes and Buckland in Philadelphia.

Bekker/Hernandez made their international debut as a team on ISU Junior Grand Prix at the 2022 JGP Slovenia in late September. They were tenth in both segments of competition to place tenth overall. At their second assignment, the 2022 JGP Poland, Bekker/Hernandez placed eighth in the rhythm dance and seventh in the free dance to finish finally in eighth place. 

In November, Bekker/Hernandez won their first junior national title at the 2021 British Championships, leading silver medalists Bushell/Lapsky by nearly 30 points. Bekker said of the win, "After such a relatively short time together, we are delighted to win our first British title." Due to their placement at nationals, Bekker/Hernandez were named to the British team for the 2022 World Junior Championships in Tallinn. Before Junior Worlds, Bekker/Hernandez were assigned to the Egna Dance Trophy where they finished seventh. Competing in Tallinn, Bekker/Hernandez were tenth in the rhythm dance and eleventh in the free dance to place tenth overall.

2022–23 season 
Beginning the new season at British Ice Skating's new Britannia Cup event, Bekker/Hernandez won gold. On the Junior Grand Prix, Bekker/Hernandez won the silver medal at the 2022 JGP Czech Republic. They won a second silver medal at the 2022 JGP Poland I, in the process becoming the first British dance team to qualify for a Junior Grand Prix Final. Following the end of the Junior Grand Prix, they won their second British junior national title.

Competing at the Final in Torino, they finished second in the rhythm dance, aided by a double-fall by pre-event favourites Mrázková/Mrázek. Hernandez commented on attending the event, saying it was "a really surreal moment, walking down the steps. We've never walked into an area with ambient lighting before. It felt very special." They were overtaken in the free dance by both Lim/Quan of South Korea and Mrázková/Mrázek, finishing fourth overall.

In the new year, Bekker/Hernandez won the bronze medal at the Bavarian Open, finishing behind Grimm/Savitskiy of Germany and Americans Neset/Markelov. They entered the 2023 World Junior Championships in Calgary as possible podium contenders, and set a new personal best score of 68.89 in the rhythm dance, finishing 0.89 points ahead of Canadian team Bashynska/Beaumont, who had been expected to contend for the title but erred on their pattern segment. Bekker/Hernandez earned a bronze small medal for the segment. In the free dance they set another new personal best, but they finished fourth in the segment and, by 0.06 points, fourth overall behind the Canadians due to a one-point deduction for an extended lift. Bekker said that they had "mixed feelings and emotions" about the outcome.

Programs

With Bekker

With Brown

Competitive highlights 
JGP: Junior Grand Prix

With Bekker

With Brown

Detailed results 
ISU personal bests highlighted in bold.''

With Bekker

Junior results

With Brown

References

External links 
 
 

2001 births
Living people
British male ice dancers
English male ice dancers
People from Amersham